John Bell may refer to:

Arts and entertainment
John Zephaniah Bell (1794–1883), Scottish artist
John Bell (sculptor) (1812–1895), British sculptor
John Hyslop Bell (1833–1920), Scottish journalist, newspaper owner and editor
J. Bowyer Bell (1931–2003), American historian, artist and art critic
John Bell (radio personality) (born 1934), American disc jockey
John Bell Jr. (artist) (1937–2013), American painter and sculptor
John Bell (Australian actor) (born 1940), Australian actor and director
John Kim Bell (born 1952), Canadian conductor
John Bell (special effects artist), Academy Award nominated special effects artist
John Bell (rock musician) (born 1962), American guitarist and lead singer for Widespread Panic
John P. Bell (born 1979), American digital artist, educator and software developer
John Bell (Scottish actor) (born 1997), Scottish actor

Law and politics

John Bell (Leominster MP) (fl. 1508–1533/44), English MP for Leominster
John Bell (Winchelsea MP) (fl. 1514–1543), English MP for Winchelsea
John Bell (barrister) (1764–1836), English barrister
John Bell (New Hampshire politician) (1765–1836), American politician, governor of New Hampshire
John Bell (Ohio politician) (1796–1869), U.S. Representative, mayor of two cities in Ohio, and probate judge
John Bell (Tennessee politician) (1796–1869), U.S. House Speaker, Secretary of War, Senator, and presidential candidate
John Montgomerie Bell (1804–1862), advocate of the Scottish bar, and sheriff of Kincardine
John Bell (Liberal politician) (1809–1851), British politician, MP for Thirsk
John Bell (Wisconsin politician), Wisconsin state assemblyman in 1853
John Alexander Bell (1829–1901), member of the Queensland Legislative Council
John Hedley Bell (1840–1897), politician in Manitoba, Canada
Sir John Charles Bell (1843–1924), British businessman and Lord Mayor of London
John Calhoun Bell (1851–1933), U.S. Representative from Colorado
John C. Bell (lawyer) (1861–1935), Pennsylvania lawyer
John R. Bell (trade unionist) (1862–1924), British trade union leader and political activist
John C. Bell Jr. (1892–1974), American judge and governor of Pennsylvania
John J. Bell (1910–1963), U.S. Representative from Texas
John William Bell (1838–1901), Canadian politician
John Howatt Bell (1846–1929), Canadian politician
John R. Bell (military officer), governor of East Florida, 1821
John Bell (Florida politician) (1916–1982), American politician, Florida State Representative and State Senator
John Bell (legal scholar), British professor of law and fellow of Pembroke College, Cambridge
John Peter Bell, Canadian diplomat
John Bell (Virginia politician) (born 1963), member of the Virginia State Senate
John R. Bell IV (born 1979), American politician, member of the North Carolina General Assembly

Literature 
John Bell (traveller) (1691–1780), Scottish traveller and author
John Bell (publisher) (1745–1831), English publisher
John Bell (folk music) (1783–1864), English folk song collector
John Gray Bell (1823–1866), English bookseller
John Joy Bell (1871–1934), Scottish author
John Bell (historian) (born 1952), Canadian archivist and comic book historian

Religion 
John Bell (bishop of Mayo) (died 1541), clergyman in Ireland
John Bell (bishop of Worcester) (died 1556), English clergyman
John Bell (dean of Ely) (died 1591), English priest and academic
John Bell (Wesleyan minister) (1788–1855), Wesleyan minister from England who came to Newfoundland
John Bell (Australian priest) (1898–1983), Australian Anglican priest
John L. Bell (born 1949), Scottish religious leader, musician, and composer

Science 
John Bell (surgeon) (1763–1820), Scottish anatomist and surgeon
John Graham Bell (1812–1899), American taxidermist
John Stewart Bell (1928–1990), physicist from Northern Ireland
John Lane Bell (born 1945), mathematician and philosopher
Sir John Bell (physician) (born 1952), British–Canadian biologist
John Cameron Bell (born 1953), Canadian cancer researcher
John B. Bell (born 1954), American mathematician

Sport 
John Bell (footballer, born 1886) (1886–1917), Australian rules footballer killed during World War I
John Bell (footballer, born 1901) (1901–1973), English association football winger
John Bell (English cricketer) (1895–1974), English cricketer
John Bell (1920s Scottish footballer), Scottish football striker
John Bell (1930s Scottish footballer), Scottish football forward
John Bell (footballer, born 1919) (1919–1994), English football full back
Johnny Bell (Canadian football) (1921–1998), Canadian football player
John A. Bell, American football coach
John Robert Bell (1922–2008), American college football coach and athletics administrator
John Bell (field hockey) (born 1933), British Olympic hockey player
John Bell (bowls) (born 1947), British bowler
John Bell (footballer, born 1949), Australian rules footballer
John Bell (Australian cricketer) (born 1949), Australian cricketer
J. W. Bell (John-Wessel Bell, born 1990), South African-born rugby union player in Spain

Others 
John Bell (artillerist) (1747–1798), English artillerist
John Bell (farmer) (1750–1820), central figure in the Bell Witch ghost story of southern American folklore
Sir John Bell (British Army officer) (1782–1876), British general and Lieutenant Governor of Guernsey
John Bell (explorer) (c. 1799–1868), Canadian explorer and Hudson's Bay Company governor
John Thomas Bell (1878–1965), British businessman, founder of Bellway

See also 
Jack Bell (disambiguation)
John Bell & Croyden, a pharmacy on Wigmore Street, London
John Bell Farm, listed on the National Register of Historic Places listings in eastern Chester County, Pennsylvania
John and Margaret Bell House, listed on the National Register of Historic Places listings in eastern Walworth County, Wisconsin
John Brown Bell, an American Civil War-era bell that is often known as the "second-most important bell in American history"
Johnbell, an extinct genus of ungulates

Jon Bell (born 1997), American soccer player
Jonathan Bell (disambiguation)
John C. Bell (disambiguation)
Johnny Bell (born 1965), American politician in Kentucky
John Bell Hood (1831–1879), Confederate general
John Bell Williams (1918–1983), Governor of Mississippi